This is a list of films which have placed number one at the weekend box office in Lithuania during 2021.

See also
 List of Lithuanian films — Lithuanian films by year

References

 

2021
2021 in Lithuania
Lithuania